Lake Parangi is a small supertrophic (i.e. saturated in phosphorus and nitrogen, with excessive phytoplankton growth after a few weeks of calm, sunny weather), dune-dammed lake 3 km north of Kawhia in the Waikato region of New Zealand. In 1937 Lake Parangi was described as having, "a steep sand-cliff at one end of it and is reputed to be bottomless. Here and there are groves of gnarled pohutukawas, serving as valuable landmarks in the Sahara-like wilderness of the dunes."

Biota 
Lake Parangi has freshwater mussels, eels, pondweed Potamogeton ochreatus and watermilfoil Myriophyllum triphyllum. Catfish have been introduced and water quality is deteriorating. Canadian Waterweed has invaded much of the lake.

External links 
 1:50,000 map of area

See also 
List of lakes in New Zealand

References 

Parangi
Ōtorohanga District